Marshall Commons is a collection of dormitories, as well as a dining facility, on the south-central campus of Marshall University in Huntington, West Virginia, USA. Completed in the fall of 2003, Marshall Commons consists of Gibson, Wellman, Haymaker, and Willis Residence Halls, along with Harless Cafe. Each dormitory structure contains four single-occupancy bedrooms, two double-occupancy bedrooms, and four double-occupancy bedrooms. Harless Cafe is also home to a small fitness center.

Marshall Commons gained nationwide recognition as the first residence hall in the United States not to offer landline service to its students. Each resident was given one cellular telephone to use, and service coverage area was within the 48 states.

See also 
 Buildings at Marshall University
 Cityscape of Huntington, West Virginia
 Marshall University

References

External links 
 Marshall Commons at Marshall University

Marshall University
Buildings and structures in Huntington, West Virginia